Ciarán Hinds (born 9 February 1953) is an Irish actor. Born in Belfast, Hinds is known for a range of screen and stage roles. He has starred in feature films including The Cook, the Thief, His Wife & Her Lover (1989), Persuasion (1995), Oscar and Lucinda (1997), Road to Perdition (2002), The Sum of All Fears (2002), Munich (2005), Amazing Grace (2007), There Will Be Blood (2007), Miss Pettigrew Lives for a Day (2008), Harry Potter and the Deathly Hallows – Part 2 (2011), Tinker Tailor Soldier Spy (2011), Silence (2016), First Man (2018), and Belfast (2021). He was nominated for the Academy Award for Best Supporting Actor for the last of these.

Hinds is also known for his voice role as Grand Pabbie, the Troll King in the animated film Frozen (2013) and its sequel, Frozen II (2019). He played General Zakharow in Red Sparrow (2018). He also portrayed Steppenwolf in Zack Snyder's Justice League (2017) and its 2021 director's cut. His television roles include Julius Caesar in the series Rome, DCI James Langton in Above Suspicion, and Mance Rayder in Game of Thrones. In addition, Hinds appeared in series 3 of Shetland (TV series) (2016), produced by ITV. As a stage actor Hinds has spent periods with the Royal Shakespeare Company, the Royal National Theatre, and six seasons with Glasgow Citizens' Theatre, and he has continued to work on stage throughout his career. In 2020, he was listed at number 31 on The Irish Times list of Ireland's greatest film actors.

Early life
Hinds was born on 9 February 1953 in Belfast, Northern Ireland. Raised as a Catholic in north Belfast, he was one of five children and the only son of his doctor father, Gerry, and schoolteacher and amateur actress mother, Moya.

He was an Irish dancer in his youth and was educated at Holy Family Primary School and St Malachy's College. After leaving St Malachy's, he then attended the College of Business Studies before enrolling as a law student at Queen's University Belfast, but was soon persuaded to pursue acting and abandoned his studies at Queen's to enrol at the Royal Academy of Dramatic Art, finishing in 1975.

Career

Hinds began his professional acting career at the Glasgow Citizens' Theatre in a production of Cinderella (1976). He remained a frequent performer at the Citizens' Theatre during the late 1970s and through the mid-1980s. During this same period, Hinds also performed on stage in Ireland with the Abbey Theatre, the Field Day Theatre Company, the Druid Theatre, the Lyric Players' Theatre and at the Project Arts Centre. In 1987, he was cast by Peter Brook in The Mahabharata, a six-hour theatre piece that toured the world, and he also featured in its 1989 film version. Hinds almost missed the casting call in Paris due to difficulties renewing his Irish passport. In the early 1990s, he was a member of the Royal Shakespeare Company.

He appeared in the title role of the RSC's production of Richard III in 1993, directed by Sam Mendes, who turned to Hinds as a last minute replacement for an injured Simon Russell Beale. Hinds gained his most popular recognition as a stage actor for his performance as Larry in the London and Broadway productions of Patrick Marber's Tony Award-nominated play Closer. In 1999, Hinds was awarded both the Theatre World Award for Best Debut in New York and the Outer Critics Circle Award for Special Achievement (Best Ensemble Cast Performance) for his work in Closer. He was on stage in 2001 in The Yalta Game by Brian Friel at Dublin's Gate Theatre. He appeared on Broadway in The Seafarer by Conor McPherson, which ran at the Booth Theatre from December 2007 through March 2008. In February 2009 he took the leading role of General Sergei Kotov in Burnt by the Sun by Peter Flannery at London's National Theatre. Hinds returned to the stage later in 2009 with a role in Conor McPherson's play The Birds, which opened at Dublin's Gate Theatre in September 2009.

Hinds made his feature film debut in John Boorman's Excalibur in 1981. He played Captain Frederick Wentworth in Jane Austen's Persuasion in 1995, Jonathan Reiss in Lara Croft Tomb Raider: The Cradle of Life and John Traynor in Veronica Guerin, both in 2003, and Firmin in the film version of Andrew Lloyd Webber's The Phantom of the Opera in 2004. Hinds also played Carl, a professional assisting a group of assassins, in Steven Spielberg's political thriller, Munich in 2005. In 2006, he appeared in Michael Mann's film adaptation of the 80's television show, Miami Vice, and as Herod the Great in The Nativity Story. In the 2006 film Amazing Grace, Hinds portrayed Sir Banastre Tarleton, one of the chief opponents of abolition of the slave trade in Parliament. He starred in Margot at the Wedding, alongside Nicole Kidman, Jack Black and Jennifer Jason Leigh, in a comedy-drama about family secrets and relationships. He also appeared in 2007's There Will Be Blood, directed by Paul Thomas Anderson.

On television, Hinds portrayed Gaius Julius Caesar in the first season of BBC/HBO's series, Rome in 2006. He has also been featured in a number of made-for-television films, including the role of Michael Henchard in Thomas Hardy's The Mayor of Casterbridge in 2004, for which he received the Irish Film and Television Award for Best Actor in a Dramatic Series. Additional television performances include Edward Parker-Jones in the crime drama series Prime Suspect 3 (1993), Abel Mason in Dame Catherine Cookson's The Man Who Cried (1993), Jim Browner in The Memoirs of Sherlock Holmes episode "The Cardboard Box" (1994), Fyodor Glazunov in the science fiction miniseries Cold Lazarus (1996), Edward Rochester in Charlotte Brontë's Jane Eyre (1997), the Knight Templar Brian de Bois-Guilbert in Sir Walter Scott's Ivanhoe (1997) and a portrayal of the French existentialist Albert Camus in Broken Morning (2003).

In 1996, Hinds acted as a police detective in the Tales from the Crypt episode "Confessions".

Hinds was featured in two notable television docudramas: Granada Television's docudrama Who Bombed Birmingham? (1990) in which Hinds portrayed Richard McIlkenny, a Belfastman falsely imprisoned for an IRA bombing; and HBO's docudrama Hostages (1993), where he portrayed Irish writer and former hostage Brian Keenan. Hinds starred opposite Kelly Reilly in Above Suspicion, a TV adaptation of Lynda La Plante's detective story, which was broadcast in the United Kingdom in January 2009; he returned for the sequels The Red Dahlia (2010), Deadly Intent (2011) and Silent Scream (2012). Hinds has performed in audiobook and radio productions as well. He performed as Valmont in the BBC Radio production of Les Liaisons Dangereuses, and also narrated the Penguin Audiobook Ivanhoe. He also performed in Antony and Cleopatra and The Winter's Tale as part of The Complete Arkangel Shakespeare, an audio production of Shakespeare's plays which won the 2004 Audie Award for Best Audio Drama. He read the short story "A Painful Case" for the Caedmon Audio version of James Joyce's Dubliners.

Hinds played the role of Albus Dumbledore's brother Aberforth in Harry Potter and the Deathly Hallows – Part 2, the final film in the Harry Potter series. Also in 2011, he appeared as David Peretz in the 1997 sections of The Debt alongside Helen Mirren and Tom Wilkinson. Hinds played Roy Bland in the 2011 adaptation of the John le Carré's Tinker, Tailor, Soldier, Spy.

In September 2011, Hinds returned to the Abbey Theatre in Dublin to star as Captain Jack Boyle in a revival of Seán O'Casey's Juno and the Paycock, alongside Sinéad Cusack as Juno. The production transferred to the National Theatre of Great Britain in November 2011 for a three-month run. He played "Jim" in the film The Shore (2011), written and directed by Terry George. The Shore won the Best Short Film, Live Action category at the 84th Annual Academy Awards (The Oscars) in 2012.

In 2013, he was cast as the wildling leader Mance Rayder in Season 3 of the HBO television series Game of Thrones. He reprised this role in Season 4, and in Season 5. On Broadway at The Richard Rodgers Theater in New York, he was Big Daddy to Scarlett Johansson in Cat on a Hot Tin Roof, which began previews on 18 December 2012 and opened on 17 January 2013.

In the summer of 2013, he performed at the Donmar Warehouse in London in the premiere production of The Night Alive, a play by Conor McPherson, which transferred in November 2013, with Hinds in the lead role, to the Atlantic Theater Company in New York.

In 2015, he was in Hamlet alongside Benedict Cumberbatch at the London Barbican, playing King Claudius. He appeared the following year as Deputy Governor Danforth in the Broadway production of Arthur Miller's play The Crucible alongside Saoirse Ronan and Ben Whishaw.

In 2018 he shot the film The Thin Man which has since been retitled The Man in the Hat in France directed by Oscar-winning composer Stephen Warbeck.

In 2017, Hinds portrayed the DC Comics villain Steppenwolf in the superhero film Justice League. Disappointed with the reshoots and changes made by Joss Whedon following director Zack Snyder's departure, including ones made to Steppenwolf's appearance and characterization, Hinds publicly supported the release of Snyder's original cut of the film, calling it superior to the theatrical version. On 18 March 2021 Snyder's version, titled Zack Snyder's Justice League, was released on the WarnerMedia Entertainment streaming service HBO Max, restoring many scenes, including those of Hinds as Steppenwolf in the character's original design, which were not featured in the theatrical version.

Hinds starred in Kenneth Branagh's 2021 film Belfast, for which Hinds received critical acclaim and won the National Board of Review for Best Supporting Actor. In August 2021, it was announced Hinds would star in the comedy-drama series The Dry, developed by Element Pictures for Britbox. In October 2021, he was cast in the thriller film In the Land of Saints and Sinners starring Liam Neeson and directed by Robert Lorenz.

Personal life
Hinds lives in Paris with his wife, the French-Vietnamese actress Hélène Patarot. They met in 1987 while in the cast of Peter Brook's production of The Mahabharata and have a daughter, Aoife Hinds, born 1991 in London, who is also an actor and has appeared in Derry Girls, Normal People, and Hellraiser.

Awards and nominations

References

Further reading
 Ciarán Hinds, entretien réalisé par Andréa Grunert,le 16 décembre 2008 http://www.objectif-cinema.com (March 2009) p. 1–10. [Interview/French]
 GRUNERT, Andrea. "Ciarán Hinds: Exkursionen ins Reich des Phantastischen" Enzyklopädie des Phantastischen Films. 98th issue. Meitingen: Corian. June 2012. p. 1–11.  [German]
 GRUNERT, Andrea. "Ciarán Hinds, acteur". Jeune Cinéma. issue 361/362. Autumn 2014. p. 62-69. [French]

External links
 
 Website dedicated to his works on stage and screen
 Youthaction.org Northern Ireland Organization Supported by Hinds

1953 births
Living people
Alumni of RADA
Male voice actors from Northern Ireland
Male film actors from Northern Ireland
Male stage actors from Northern Ireland
Male Shakespearean actors from Northern Ireland
Male television actors from Northern Ireland
People educated at St Malachy's College
Male actors from Belfast
20th-century male actors from Northern Ireland
21st-century male actors from Northern Ireland
Expatriates from Northern Ireland in France
Royal Shakespeare Company members
Theatre World Award winners